The 2019–20 Biathlon World Cup – Stage 2 was the second event of the season and is held in Hochfilzen, Austria, from 13 to 15 December 2019.

Schedule of events 
The events took place at the following times.

Medal winners

Men

Women

References 

Biathlon World Cup - Stage 2, 2019-20
2019–20 Biathlon World Cup
Biathlon World Cup - Stage 2
Biathlon competitions in Austria